Anisosciadium is a genus of flowering plant in the family Apiaceae, with 3 species. It is endemic to Southwest Asia.

References

Apioideae
Apioideae genera